Whipple Company Store is a historic company store located in Whipple, West Virginia, United States. It was built about 1900, and is a two-story, frame octagon building. It sits on a coursed stone faced foundation and features a prominent arched opening at the main entrance. As a company store, it remained in operation until August 1957, when the New River Company mine closed. However, it remained occupied by retail activities until the 1980s.

It was listed on the National Register of Historic Places in 1991.

References

Octagonal buildings in the United States
Commercial buildings on the National Register of Historic Places in West Virginia
Buildings designated early commercial in the National Register of Historic Places in West Virginia
Commercial buildings completed in 1900
Buildings and structures in Fayette County, West Virginia
National Register of Historic Places in Fayette County, West Virginia